Mantalos is a Greek surname. Notable people with the surname include:

Dionysios Mantalos (born 1952), Greek Orthodox bishop
Petros Mantalos (born 1991), Greek footballer

Greek-language surnames